Haplochromis cavifrons is a species of cichlid endemic to Lake Victoria. It is a benthopelagic fish, and is generally found a few hundred metres beyond the shore over hard substrate.  This species grows to a length of  SL.

References

cavifrons
Fish described in 1888
Taxonomy articles created by Polbot